The 2007–08 National Division Three North was the eighth season (nineteenth overall) of the fourth division (north) of the English domestic rugby union competition using the name National Division Three North.  New teams to the division included Bradford & Bingley and Harrogate who were relegated from the 2006–07 National Division Two, while promoted teams included Caldy (champions) and Beverley (playoffs), both coming up from North Division 1, with no team from Midlands Division 1 as the winners of that league, Luton, went into National Division Three South instead.  The league system was 4 points for a win, 2 points for a draw and additional bonus points being awarded for scoring 4 or more tries and/or losing within 7 points of the victorious team.  In terms of promotion the league champions would go straight up into National Division Two while the runners up would have a one-game playoff against the runners up from National Division Three South (at the home ground of the club with the superior league record) for the final promotion place.  

At the end of the season the league champions were Tynedale, who made up for the disappointment of missing out on promotion from last season's playoffs by winning the title at a canter, finishing ahead of 2nd placed Darlington Mowden Park by a massive 29 points and qualifying directly for the 2008–09 National Division Two.  As runners up Darlington Mowden Park had to go down to the 2007–08 National Division Three South runners up Cinderford for their playoff game, losing a tight encounter that finished 15 - 14 to the Gloucestershire side.  The rest of the league was extremely tight, although the relegated sides all probably deserved to go down in terms of results with newly promoted Beverley, West Park St Helens and Morley being the three sides to go down.  All three sides would drop to North Division 1 for the following season.

Participating teams and locations

Final league table

Results

Round 1

Round 2

Round 3

Round 4

Round 5

Round 6

Round 7

Round 8

Round 9

Round 10

Round 11

Round 12

Round 13 

Postponed.  Game rescheduled to 12 January 2008.

Round 14

Round 15

Round 13 (rescheduled game) 

Game rescheduled from 15 December 2007.

Round 16 

Postponed.  Game rescheduled to 2 February 2008.

Postponed.  Game rescheduled to 2 February 2008.

Postponed.  Game rescheduled to 2 February 2008.

Round 17

Round 16 (rescheduled games) 

Game rescheduled from 19 January 2008.

Game rescheduled from 19 January 2008.

Game rescheduled from 19 January 2008.

Round 18

Round 19

Round 20

Round 21

Round 22

Round 23

Round 24 

Postponed.  Game rescheduled to 5 April 2008.

Round 24 (rescheduled game) 

Game rescheduled from 29 March 2008.

Round 25

Round 26

Promotion play-off
The league runners up of National Division Three South and North would meet in a playoff game for promotion to National Division Two.  Cinderford were the southern division runners up and as they had a superior league record than northern runners-up, Darlington Mowden Park, they hosted the play-off match.

Total season attendances

Individual statistics 

 Note that points scorers includes tries as well as conversions, penalties and drop goals.

Top points scorers

Top try scorers

Season records

Team
Largest home win — 74 pts
74 - 0  Darlington Mowden Park at home to Hull Ionians on 22 December 2007
Largest away win — 49 pts
54 - 5  Leicester Lions away to Beverley on 26 January 2008
Most points scored — 74 pts
74 - 0  Darlington Mowden Park at home to Hull Ionians on 22 December 2007
Most tries in a match — 10 (x2)
Darlington Mowden Park at home to Hull Ionians on 22 December 2007
Fylde at home to Beverley on 12 April 2008
Most conversions in a match — 9 (x2)
Darlington Mowden Park at home to Hull Ionians on 22 December 2007
Fylde at home to Beverley on 12 April 2008
Most penalties in a match — 6 (x2)
Preston Grasshoppers at home to Morley on 20 October 2007
Macclesfield at home to Rugby Lions on 2 February 2008
Most drop goals in a match — 2 (x3)
West Park St Helens away to Beverley on 6 October 2007
Fylde at home to Hull Ionians on 1 December 2007
Fylde away to Beverley on 15 December 2007

Player
Most points in a match — 23
 Jon Boden for Leicester Lions at home to Hull Ionians on 19 January 2008
Most tries in a match — 4 (x2)
 Lisiate Tafa for Bradford & Bingley away to Fylde on 6 October 2007
 Gareth Roberts for Leicester Lions away to Beverley on 26 January 2008
Most conversions in a match — 8
 Stephen Nutt for Fylde at home to Beverley on 12 April 2008
Most penalties in a match — 6 (x2)
 Gerhard Boshoff for Preston Grasshoppers at home to Morley on 20 October 2007
 Ross Winney for Macclesfield at home to Rugby Lions on 2 February 2008
Most drop goals in a match — 2 (x3)
 Rob Hitchmough for West Park St Helens away to Beverley on 6 October 2007
 John Armstrong for Fylde at home to Hull Ionians on 1 December 2007
 John Armstrong for Fylde away to Beverley on 15 December 2007

Attendances
Highest — 973 
Preston Grasshoppers at home to Fylde on 22 December 2007
Lowest — 39
West Park St Helens at home to Leicester Lions on 15 December 2007
Highest Average Attendance — 423
Fylde
Lowest Average Attendance — 89
West Park St Helens

See also
 English Rugby Union Leagues
 English rugby union system
 Rugby union in England

References

External links
 NCA Rugby

2007–08
N3